Mücke is a municipality in the Vogelsbergkreis in Hesse, Germany.

Geography

Location
Mücke lies from 200 to 350 m above sea level in the northwest foothills of the Vogelsberg Mountains on the upper reaches of the river Ohm, a tributary to the Lahn

Neighbouring communities
Mücke borders in the north on the town of Homberg, in the northeast on the community of Gemünden, in the east on the community of Feldatal and the town of Ulrichstein, in the south on the town of Laubach (Gießen district), and in the west on the town of Ulrichstein and the community of Grünberg (Gießen district).

Constituent communities
The community came into being, like many other communities through Hesse's municipal reforms, with the amalgamation of twelve formerly independent communities. These are listed here:

Atzenhain
Bernsfeld
Flensungen
Groß-Eichen
Höckersdorf
Ilsdorf
Merlau (including Kirschgarten)
Nieder-Ohmen (including Windhain)
Ober-Ohmen
Ruppertenrod
Sellnrod (including Schmitten)
Wettsaasen

Among these, Nieder-Ohmen with its 2,800 inhabitants is by far the biggest. The centre of Ilsdorf bears a certain peculiarity. Until the municipal reforms, one part of Ilsdorf lay in the old district of Alsfeld, whereas the other parts were called Solms-Ilsdorf and lay in the Gießen district. This owed itself to the village's history. Ilsdorf had formerly been a part of the Province of Upper Hesse in the Landgraviate of Hesse-Darmstadt, while Solms-Ilsdorf was ruled by the Counts of Solms. Even today, this former split can still be seen in Ilsdorf, as the village has two cemeteries at its disposal.

Before the municipal reforms, there was no place with the name "Mücke", but there was a Mücke railway station on the Gießen-Fulda line (the Vogelsbergbahn) and a postal designation "Mücke".

Despite what may seem obvious – Mücke is German for "gnat" – the community's name is of Celtic origin. It comes from much or mack, meaning something like "moist" or "boggy". The name Mücke was mentioned in connection with this region in a Merlau parish taxation roll in 1482.

In the constituent community of Flensungen lies Hesse's geographical centre point.

Politics

Municipal council

As of municipal elections held on 26 March 2006 the seats are apportioned thus:
SPD 15 seats
CDU 11 seats
FWG (citizens' coalition) 8 seats
Greens 3 seats

A political peculiarity is the Jugendparlament Mücke ("Mücke Youth Parliament"), which stands up for children's and youth's interests. Its 35 members aged between 14 and 21 are elected every two years. The Jugendparlament has the right to speak and make motions on the municipal council's youth, sport and cultural committee.

Partnership
The community of Mücke maintains a partnership with:
  Sydfalster, Denmark, since 1993

Personalities

People with connections to the community
Anne Chaplet, criminal author
Reinhard Schober, from 1945 to 1948 leader of the Nieder-Ohmen forestry office
Harald Lesch, physicist, astronomer, natural philosopher, author, television presenter and professor at the *Ludwig Maximilian University of Munich (LMU), grew up in Nieder-Ohmen

Infrastructure and leisure

The community of Mücke has at its disposal, through the Homberg (Ohm) Autobahn interchange (A5) and Federal Highway (Bundesstraße) 49 that runs through the municipal area, very good transport connections. A few years ago, at the Autobahn interchange, the "Am Gottesrain" industrial park was established complete with an off-Autobahn service centre ("Autohof"). Mücke station and the station in the constituent community of Nieder-Ohmen are on the Vogelsberg Railway (Vogelsbergbahn) between Gießen and Fulda via Alsfeld.

The community has an indoor swimming pool with an adjoining sauna, seven kindergartens, two primary schools, and a comprehensive school without upper level in the constituent community of Nieder-Ohmen. Furthermore, there is a Sozialstation ( ≈ welfare station for the elderly and the sick) with trained personnel.

In all constituent communities are found Village Community Houses that may be used for all kinds of events. Moreover, there are many clubs to choose from. Anyone can find something to suit his interests.

There are plenty of supermarkets and smaller shops in each constituent community to satisfy shopping needs.

Among more particular leisure facilities is the Flensunger Hof, run by a missionary body. It is a fully equipped sport and leisure centre. On the Kratzberg in the Nieder-Ohmen rural area, the Luftsportgruppe Mücke e. V. runs a model glider airfield. In Atzenhain is the Reit- und Fahrverein Mücke e. V. with riding hall and grounds.

References

External links
Gemeinde Mücke
Nieder-Ohmen volunteer fire brigade
Mücke German Red Cross Local Association
Mücke volunteer fire brigade
Mücke CDU Local Association
Mücke Alliance '90/The Greens Local Association
Jugendparlament Mücke
Flensunger Hof

Vogelsbergkreis
Grand Duchy of Hesse